Abu Al-Khaseeb District is a district of the Basra Governorate, Iraq. Its seat is the town of Abu Al-Khaseeb.

Districts of Basra Province